Louisiana Rock & Roll is the third album by American southern rock band Potliquor. It was released in 1973.

At least one newspaper had begun reporting Louisiana Rock & Rolls release at the end of January, and by early February 1973, Janus Records had placed a full color ad across the bottom of the front page of Billboard Magazine promoting new albums by three of their artists, including Louisiana Rock & Roll. A week later, a full page advertisement appeared in Billboard concerning new albums by eleven Chess/Janus artists, among them being Potliquor's new LP,. In fact, an early release of "Waiting for Me at the River", a single from the album, had been reported as a regional breakout in New Orleans in October of the previous year. By the end of March, Billboard was reporting considerable airplay for Louisiana Rock & Roll in Valdosta, Georgia; Los Angeles, California; Hartford, Connecticut; St. Charles, Missouri; Paris, Texas; Denver, Colorado; and Toronto, Canada. "H", another single from the album, was reported being played in Lewisburg, Pennsylvania in the middle of March 1973.

Track listing

Personnel
 Jerry Amoroso  – drums, vocals, percussion
 George Ratzlaff – keyboards, vocals
 Guy Schaeffer – bass guitar, vocals
 Les Wallace – guitars, vocals
 Leon Medica – bass guitar, vocalsAdditional musicians Cy Frost – horn arrangement on “Rip It Up,” string arrangement and piano on intro to "For You," clavinet and Moog synthesizer on "H”
 Glenn Spreen – horn and string arrangements except for "Rip It Up"
 Uncle Buck Wood – fiddle on "You Can't Get There From Here"
 Gail and David Amoroso – handclaps on "Waiting for Me"
 Lee Fortier – horns
Art DeCesare – horns
Bud Brasher – horns
Pete Verbois – horns
Bill Ludwig – horns
Nick Rousse – horns
Charlie Depuy – horns
 Strings on "For You" – a combined section of the New Orleans Symphony and Baton Rouge SymphonyProduction'
Jim Brown – producer
 Cy Frost – production consultant, recording engineer
 Peter Granet – remix engineer
 F. Alessandrini – artwork
 J. W. deBuys – photography
 Dawn Studios (New Orleans) – album cover design
Mia Krinsky – album coordination
Bob Scerbo – production coordinator

References

External links

1973 albums
Potliquor albums
Janus Records albums